Thomas Bek (also spelled Beck) may refer to:

 Thomas Bek (bishop of St David's) (died 1293)
 Thomas Bek (bishop of Lincoln) (1282–1347)

See also 
 Thomas Beck (disambiguation)